Favel may refer to:

Favel, Ontario, an unincorporated place in Canada
Favel Lake, the source of the Canyon River (Ontario)
Favel Formation, a geologic formation in Manitoba, Canada
Favel Parrett, Australian writer
Favel Wordsworth, American baseball player